Asphalt: Urban GT 2 is a racing video game developed and published by Gameloft for the Nintendo DS, N-Gage and PlayStation Portable (PSP). A 2.5D Java Platform 2 ME version for mobile phones was also released. It is a sequel of Asphalt: Urban GT (2004) and the second major game of the Asphalt series.

The game features a special appearance from The Pussycat Dolls, and a sample of Moby's single "Lift Me Up". The Nintendo DS version was released approximately a year after the N-Gage version, with improved graphics, sound, and dual screen compatibility. A version for the PSP was also released in March 2007 to feature the track "Apply Some Pressure" by Maximo Park and exclusive "Time Ride" Mode for Arcade that not found in other versions.

Gameplay
The gameplay of Urban GT 2 is often compared to Burnout, Need for Speed and other titles as players can eliminate other opponents or police cars. by performing take downs. This is done by either forcing them into the wall or ramming them while using nitro. There is a wanted meter which determines the awareness level of the police if Nitro is used, takedown other competitors or causing urban havoc. much like the wanted level system in Grand Theft Auto - if the red "wanted" light flashes, it usually means that the players must do what it takes to avoid the police cars and police helicopter - otherwise they might be forced to pull over and lose their money.

Reception

Urban GT 2 was met with mixed reception. GameRankings and Metacritic gave it a score of 65% for the DS version; 62% for the Mobile version; and 30% and 42 out of 100 for the PSP version.

Frank Provo of GameSpot praised the game's improvements over the original and its selection of licensed vehicles and respective upgrades, but noted the game's poor AI. Andrew Hayward of Worthplaying however, was more critical of the game, calling it a "mundane exercise in repetition". Besides citing easy difficulty and AI problems, the use of the Pussycat Dolls was also criticised as being a "marketing gimmick".

References

External links
 Gameloft official site
 

2005 video games
N-Gage games
Nintendo DS games
Mobile games
PlayStation Portable games
Symbian software games
Video games developed in Canada
Video games about police officers
Video games set in Brazil
Video games set in Cuba
Video games set in Colombia
Video games set in Dubai
Video games set in Hong Kong
Video games set in Iraq
Video games set in the Las Vegas Valley
Video games set in London
Video games set in Miami
Video games set in New York City
Video games set in Paris
Video games set in San Francisco
Video games set in Texas
Video games set in Tokyo
Video games set in Ukraine
Asphalt (series)
Gameloft games
Multiplayer and single-player video games
Java platform games
Virtuos games
J2ME games